is a Japanese singer, voice actress, and television presenter, represented by Sony Music Records. She is a member of the idol group Hinatazaka46.

Early life 
Nibu was born in Tochigi Prefecture and lived in Gunma Prefecture until she was eight years old, and currently lives in Saitama Prefecture. She has two older brothers.

Nibu holds a third dan rank in kendo and took part in prefectural tournaments when she was in middle school.

Career

Music 
Nibu considered becoming an idol after listening to the Keyakizaka46 song "Silent Majority" and joined the audition for Hiragana Keyakizaka46 (now Hinatazaka46), which was a subgroup of Keyakizaka46. On August 15, 2017, she was publicly introduced as a second generation member of Hiragana Keyakizaka46.

Nibu would serve as a title song center (lead performer) for the first time for Hinatazaka46's ninth single "One Choice", to be released on April 19, 2023.

Voice acting 
Nibu and fellow Hinatazaka46 members Miku Kanemura and Miho Watanabe were voice actresses for the animated miniseries adaptation of the character Pickles the Frog, aired in October 2020.

Nibu made her feature film voice acting debut in 2021's Deemo: Memorial Keys. Despite her inexperience, executive director Junichi Fujisaku remarked that he treated her "equally" to the other voice actors, while co-star Ayana Taketatsu commented that her performance did not "feel like that of a first-timer". Nibu herself also cited the 2021 drama Koeharu!, in which she portrayed an aspiring voice actress, as an influence.

In April 2022, Nibu became the voice of main character Mami in the animated shorts miniseries (four minutes per episode) , aired as a segment of the TV Asahi variety show  and also released on YouTube. It was based on a one-shot manga titled Mameo, with original concept by her and written and illustrated by mangaka  in May 2021 on the variety show  on the same network.

Other ventures 

Nibu is an avid gamer and occasionally appears in game-related events. She also co-hosted the esports show  on TV Tokyo and is a recurring guest in Hiroiki Ariyoshi's gaming show 

Nibu is a fan of shōnen manga, particularly Dragon Ball and The Promised Neverland. In 2018, she guested in an Animax special feature to commemorate the release of Dragon Ball Super: Broly. In 2020, she provided audio commentary for an episode rerun of The Promised Neverland on Noitamina.

On May 24, 2022, Nibu announced that her first photobook would be released on July 26, published by Gentosha. Titled , the photos were taken throughout 2021, with summer pictures taken in the Setouchi region and winter pictures in the Aomori Prefecture. The book sold 46,000 copies in its release week and placed first on the weekly Oricon photobook chart and second on the general book chart.

Personal life 
Nibu is a fan of Aimyon. She has attended Aimyon's concert and received a signed album from her.

Discography 

Nibu has participated in all Hinatazaka46 title songs. Other notable appearances include:

 "Kirei ni Naritai" (Hashiridasu Shunkan, 2018), as a trio with Nao Kosaka and Miho Watanabe
 "Cage" ("Do Re Mi Sol La Si Do" B-side, 2019), co-center with Mei Higashimura as the Yancharu Family
 "Kimi no Tame Nani ga Dekiru Darou" ("Sonna Koto Nai yo" B-side, 2020), center
 "Koe no Ashiato" ("Kimi Shika Katan" B-side, 2021), Koeharu! theme song, co-center with Mirei Sasaki
 "Akubi Letter" ("Tteka" B-side, 2021), with Miku Kanemura and Miho Watanabe as Color Chart

Video albums

Filmography

Theatre

Television

Dramas

Animated series

Variety and talk shows

Film

Animation

Radio

Bibliography

Notes

References

External links 
  

Hinatazaka46 members
Voice actresses from Saitama Prefecture
2001 births
Living people
Musicians from Saitama Prefecture